This is a 2020 timeline of events in the Somali Civil War (2009–present).

January 

 18 January 2020, a suicide car bombing killed four and injured at least 20 others in Afgooye, approximately 30 kilometres (19 mi) from the Somali capital, Mogadishu.

August 

 8 August 2020, a suicide car bombing at the gates of the 12th April Army Brigade military base close to the recently reopened Mogadishu sports stadium in the Warta Nabadda district of Mogadishu. 8 soldiers were killed.

December 

 18 December 2020, a suicide bombing committed by Al-Shabaab in the city of Galkayo, Somalia. The Bombing killed 17 including four high ranking military commanders.

See also 

 Somali Civil War (2009–present)

References 

2020 in Somalia
Conflicts in 2020
Somali Civil War (2009–present) by year
Lists of armed conflicts in 2020